Istgah-e Rah Ahan-e Haft Tappeh (also Romanized as Īstgāh-e Rāh Āhan-e Haft Tappeh; also known as Īstgāh-e Haft Tappeh) is a village in Hoseynabad Rural District, in the Central District of Shush County, Khuzestan Province, Iran. At the 2006 census, its population was 190, in 32 families.

References 

Populated places in Shush County